Absolutely No Alternative is the eighth studio album by Canadian heavy metal band Anvil, released in 1997. It is the first release with Glenn "Five" Gyorffy on bass replacing Michael Duncan.

Track listing

Personnel
Anvil
 Steve "Lips" Kudlow — vocals, lead guitar
 Ivan Hurd — lead guitar
 Glenn Gyorffy — bass
 Robb Reiner — drums

Production
 Daryn Barry — engineer, mixing at Phase One Studios, Toronto
 Paul Lachapelle — assistant engineer

References

Anvil (band) albums
1997 albums
Massacre Records albums